Hellqvist is a Swedish surname. Notable people with the surname include:

Carl Gustaf Hellqvist (1851–1890), Swedish painter
Sofia Hellqvist (now Princess Sofia, Duchess of Värmland; born 1984), Swedish model and wife of Prince Carl Philip, Duke of Värmland

See also
Hellquist

Swedish-language surnames